Tower is a 1987 Soviet drama film directed by Viktor Tregubovich.

Plot 
Near the suburban highway there is a water tower, behind the fence of which the mechanic and his family live. And suddenly they are visited by a Moscow family whose car broke down.

Cast 
 Olga Ostroumova as Kara Semenovna
 Vadim Lobanov as Ivan Vasilyevich
 Georgiy Burkov as Sanya
 Sergey Sazontev as Dima
 Ivan Agafonov as Ivan Filippovich
 Raisa Ryazanova as Talia
 Irina Apeksimova as Ksyusha
 Aleksey Yasulovich as Venya
 Svetlana Gaytan as Pasha

References

External links 
 

1987 films
1980s Russian-language films
Soviet drama films
1987 drama films